Kris Franklin Manery (born September 24, 1954) is a Canadian former professional ice hockey player who played 250 games in the National Hockey League (NHL). He played for the Cleveland Barons, Minnesota North Stars, Vancouver Canucks, and Winnipeg Jets between 1977 and 1981.

Manery received the final second assist in Cleveland Barons' franchise history, on a goal by Dennis Maruk in the third period of Cleveland's 3–2 loss against the Pittsburgh Penguins on April 9, 1977.

Manery was born in Leamington, Ontario. He is the brother of Randy Manery.

Career statistics

Regular season and playoffs

Awards and honours

References

External links
 

1954 births
Living people
Binghamton Whalers players
Canadian ice hockey right wingers
Cleveland Barons (NHL) players
ECH Chur players
EHC Kloten players
Ice hockey people from Ontario
Michigan Wolverines men's ice hockey players
Minnesota North Stars players
Oklahoma City Stars players
People from Leamington, Ontario
SC Rapperswil-Jona Lakers players
Tulsa Oilers (1964–1984) players
Undrafted National Hockey League players
Vancouver Canucks players
Wiener EV players
Winnipeg Jets (1979–1996) players